The Mores of the Russian Clergy is a book by Soviet historian of religion and advocate of atheism Yefim Grekulov, originally published in 1928.

Content 
Publication of the book in 2011 contains the following chapters:
Foreword by Alexander Nevzorov
Composition of ancient clergy
Church - the bearer of culture and education
"The immense upivanie"
"Prodigal obyadenie"
"Carnal lust"
"Sodom misery"
"Special acquiring"
Moneylenders from the clergy
The mores of the clergy in the XIII century

References

Publications 
 Grekulov Y. F. The mores of the Russian clergy. — Moscow, 1929
 Grekulov Y. F. The mores of the Russian clergy. — Saint-Petersburg: Nevzorov Haute Ecole, 2011, 2011. — 96 p. —

Literature 
 
 
 
 
 
 
 

Books critical of religion
1928 non-fiction books
Russian books